Kathryn Kraemer Troutman (born October 5, 1947) is an American author, consultant, and career trainer who assists jobseekers interested in working for the U.S. government. She is the founder and president of The Resume Place, Inc. (est. 1971), a service business located in Baltimore, MD that consults on, writes, and designs federal and private-sector resumes.

Troutman has been presented in the media as an expert on the Federal Resume, on Senior Executive Service Applications, and on federal career consulting in general. She has worked in this field since 1971, has published nine books on these subjects, and is known in federal hiring circles as the "Federal Resume Guru."

In 1995, as the U.S. government began phasing out the very long Standard Form 171, Troutman wrote the "Federal Resume Guidebook," the first ever book on how to write a federal resume. The "Federal Resume Guidebook" is now in its 7th Edition.

Other Troutman federal career publications include "The Stars Are Lined Up for Military Spouses," 2nd Edition, winner of Best Military Nonfiction in the Independent Press Awards 2020; "The Student’s Federal Career Guide," 4th Edition (3rd Edition won the 2013 Foreword Indie Gold Award in Career); the "Military to Federal Career Guide," 2nd Edition; and the "Jobseeker’s Guide," 8th Edition.

Troutman has appeared online, in print, and on radio and television to answer questions about federal careers, resume writing, and job search techniques. Troutman has appeared repeatedly on www.washingtonpost.com’s Federal Diary Live On-Line and www.federalnewsradio.com. On August 26, 2020, Troutman was the guest for a "Life After COVID" segment on Mike Causey's "Your Turn" program on Federal News Network to discuss current strategies for applying for federal job openings that continue to appear on the USAJobs.gov website despite and in some cases because of the coronavirus crisis.

Troutman regularly leads workshops on Federal Resumes and the federal job search for a variety of audiences, including people at military bases such as Misawa Air Base, Japan, U.S. Army Fort Huachuca, Arizona, and Schofield Army Barracks, Oahu, Hawaii. Her articles are featured on www.Military.com.

As an HR Thought Leader and Practitioner, Troutman was a member of the SmartBrief on Workforce Advisory Board. She is currently a publisher member of the Independent Book Publishers Association (IBPA).

Bibliography
 The Stars Are Lined Up for Military Spouses, 2nd Edition, 2017
 Creating Your First Resume, 1st Edition, 2016
 Federal Resume Guidebook, 1st Edition, 1995; 7th Edition, 2018
 Jobseeker’s Guide, Ten Steps to a Federal Job, 8th Edition, 2017
 Military to Federal Career Guide, 2nd Edition, 2012
 Ten Steps to a Federal Job & CD-ROM, 3rd Edition, 2011
 Writing Your NSPS Self-Assessment 2nd Edition, 2009
 Student's Federal Career Guide, 4th Edition, 2018 (Updated for 2020)

Co-Authored Works:
 The ALJ Writing Guide (with Nicole Schultheis), 2nd Edition, 2016
 The New SES Application (with Diane Hudson), 2nd Edition, 2018

References

External links
 The Resume Place, Inc. Official website
 Podcast Episodes Featuring Kathryn Troutman

1947 births
21st-century American writers
American businesspeople
Living people
21st-century American women writers